These are the RPM magazine Dance number one hits of 1993.

Chart history

See also
1993 in Canadian music
List of RPM number-one dance singles chart (Canada)

References

External links
 Read about RPM Magazine at the AV Trust
 Search RPM charts here at Library and Archives Canada

 
Dance
Dance
RPM electronic dance music chart
Dance music